The Jere Shine site (1MT6) is an archaeological site on the Tallapoosa River near its confluence with the Coosa River in modern Montgomery County, Alabama. Based on comparison of archaeological remains and pottery styles, scholars believe that it was most likely occupied from 1400–1550 CE by people of the South Appalachian Mississippian culture (a regional variation of the Mississippian culture).

Shine I and II phases
Jere Shine is the type site for the Shine I phase (?-1400 CE), and the Lamar culture Shine II phase (1400-1550 CE) in the lower Tallapoosa River region. The site was the  largest settlement associated with the Shine II phase and is thought by archaeologists to have been the main site of a chiefdom. The Shine II phase has been tentatively identified with the protohistoric Province of Talisi encountered by the Hernando de Soto expedition in 1540.

The  site contains five platform mounds and numerous shell middens. It was added to the National Register of Historic Places on December 8, 1978.

See also
 Moundville site
 Taskigi Mound

References

External links
 Households and Hegemony: Early Creek Prestige Goods, Symbolic Capital, and Social Power Cameron B. Wesson
 Mapping the Mississippian Shatter Zone: The Colonial Indian Slave Trade and Regional Instability in the American South By Robbie Franklyn Ethridge, Sheri Marie Shuck-Hall

South Appalachian Mississippian culture
National Register of Historic Places in Montgomery County, Alabama
Archaeological sites on the National Register of Historic Places in Alabama
Mounds in Alabama
Former populated places in Alabama
Geography of Montgomery County, Alabama
Archaeological sites in Alabama
Shell middens in the United States
Archaeological type sites